Aslı Çakır Alptekin (born 20 August 1985 in Antalya) is a former Turkish female middle-distance runner. A member of the Üsküdar Belediyespor in Istanbul, she is coached by her husband, runner Ihsan Alptekin. She was banned for life for repeated doping offenses.

Athletics career

Alptekin won the gold medal in the 1500 m at the 2011 Summer Universiade held in Shenzhen, China. She also won the bronze medal in the 1500 m event at the 2012 World Indoor Championships held in Istanbul. 

Both of these titles were later stripped off her upon failed doping tests.

Alptekin recorded her personal best in 1500m with 3:56.62 at the Diamond League meet in Paris on 6 July 2012. Six weeks later, she won the gold medal at the 2012 Olympics in the 1500 m event. Alptekin was also stripped of her Olympic title as a result of her use of banned substances and methods.

Doping cases
Alptekin received a two-year ban from the track in September 2004 due to positive testing for illegal substances. The positive test came at the 2004 World Junior Championships, where she was the fastest in the heats of the steeplechase and placed sixth in the final.

On 22 March 2013, several news agencies reported that Alptekin was one of eight athletes who tested positive for banned substances. Alptekin faced a lifetime ban if the positive test was upheld. Neither the IAAF nor WADA officially commented on the doping allegation. On 3 December, the Turkish Athletic Federation announced that they had cleared her of the charges. The IAAF subsequently appealed the Turkish federation's decision to clear Alptekin to the Court of Arbitration for Sport and again suspended the athlete from competition.

On 17 August 2015, the Court of Arbitration for Sport says it approved a settlement agreed to by Alptekin and the IAAF. Alptekin agreed to give up her 1500 m Olympic title and serve an eight-year ban for blood doping. Alptekin forfeited all her results from 29 July 2010, including the 2012 Olympic gold and her 2012 European Championship title.

She returned that year after the ban was halved and its start date backdated to 2013, but has since reoffended.

On 23 September 2017, Alptekin was banned for life after a third doping offence. "We are never, ever going to allow doping," said Turkish Athletics Federation chief Fatih Cintimar.

Personal life
Alptekin returned to the tracks in 2006, motivated by her future husband İhsan Alptekin, who gave up his athletics career early to coach her. The two married in 2011 in Aslı's hometown of Antalya.

Alptekin was a student of physical education and sports at the Dumlupınar University in Kütahya.

International competitions

See also
 Turkish women in sports

References

External links
 

1985 births
Living people
Sportspeople from Antalya
Turkish female middle-distance runners
Turkish female steeplechase runners
Olympic athletes of Turkey
Athletes (track and field) at the 2008 Summer Olympics
Athletes (track and field) at the 2012 Summer Olympics
World Athletics Championships athletes for Turkey
Doping cases in athletics
Turkish sportspeople in doping cases
Competitors stripped of Summer Olympics medals
21st-century Turkish sportswomen